"Two Piña Coladas" is a song recorded by American country music artist Garth Brooks.  It was released in March 1998 as the third single from his album Sevens.  It hit No. 1 on the Billboard Country Charts in 1998.  A concert version is available on Double Live.  The song was written by Shawn Camp, Benita Hill and Sandy Mason. Camp provides an additional acoustic guitar.

The song

Content
A man feeling the blues (most likely a love problem), turns on the news when a person comes on, claiming that "heartaches are healed by the sea." Without a moment's notice, he heads down to the beach, eager for a night on the town. After two piña coladas, the man begins to feel elated, and at this point never wants to leave. The chorus also suggests that he continues drinking, specifically, drinking Captain Morgan, until he forgets his troubles and is happy.

The music
The song is in F major with an approximate tempo of 120 beats per minute and a moderate Latin music feel, punctuated by several acoustic guitar runs (mostly performed by Shawn Camp, the song's co-writer). A large crowd of singers joins Brooks on the song's final chorus.

"Two Piña Coladas" gained the number 29 position on the CMT 40 Greatest Drinking Songs: Morning After broadcast.

Personnel
Per liner notes.

 "Big Al" – backing vocals
 Garth Brooks – lead and backing vocals
 Shawn Camp – acoustic guitar, backing vocals
 Mark Casstevens – acoustic guitar
 Mike Chapman – bass guitar
 "Double D" – backing vocals
 Sam "The Man" Duczer – backing vocals
 Charles Green – backing vocals
 Chris Leuzinger – electric guitar
 Mat Lindsey – backing vocals
 Sandy Mason – backing vocals
 Dorothy "The Birthday Girl" Robinson – backing vocals
 Milton Sledge – drums

Chart positions
"Two Pina Coladas" debuted at number 50 on the U.S. Billboard Hot Country Singles & Tracks for the week of December 6, 1997.

Year-end charts

References

1998 singles
1997 songs
Garth Brooks songs
Songs written by Shawn Camp (musician)
Song recordings produced by Allen Reynolds
Capitol Records Nashville singles
Songs about alcohol